The 1917 Rotherham by-election was a parliamentary by-election held for the House of Commons constituency of Rotherham in the West Riding of Yorkshire on 5 February 1917.

Vacancy
The by-election was caused by the elevation to the peerage of the sitting Liberal MP, Joseph ‘Jack’ Pease.

Candidates

The Rotherham Liberals adopted Arthur Richardson as their new candidate. Richardson had been Lib-Lab MP for Nottingham South from 1906 until January 1910. Richardson immediately declared his position as being in favour of the successful prosecution of the war and the defeat of German militarism.

No nominations were received from the other parties, who were apparently content to honour the wartime electoral truce and Richardson was therefore returned unopposed.

The result

See also
List of United Kingdom by-elections 
United Kingdom by-election records
Rotherham by-election for contests of 1899, 1910,1976,1994 and 2012

References

By-elections to the Parliament of the United Kingdom in South Yorkshire constituencies
Unopposed by-elections to the Parliament of the United Kingdom in English constituencies
Elections in Rotherham
1917 elections in the United Kingdom
1917 in England
1910s in Yorkshire
February 1917 events